Tutankhamen Marqués Reyes (born October 28, 1977) is a former American football guard. He was drafted by the New Orleans Saints in the fifth round of the 2000 NFL Draft. He played college football at Mississippi.

He has played for the Carolina Panthers, Buffalo Bills, Jacksonville Jaguars, New York Giants and Houston Texans.

Early years
Reyes attended August Martin High School in Queens, New York and was a standout in football and basketball. In football, he garnered All-Queens honors and was selected to the Coaches All-City Team. As a senior, he posted 18 receptions for 413 yards and five touchdowns as a tight end.

College career
Reyes made 25 starts, including 24 in a row at left tackle, during his final two seasons at Ole Miss. As a senior in 1999, he received Second-team All-Southeastern Conference honors by coaches. Reyes helped the Rebels finish third in the SEC with a 7–4 record and defeat the University of Oklahoma in the Independence Bowl. The Rebels offense ranked second in the SEC with 182.5 rushing yards per game as running back Deuce McAllister led the conference with 169.2 all-purpose yards per game.

Professional career

New Orleans Saints
Reyes was drafted by the New Orleans Saints in the fifth round of the 2000 NFL Draft and played for the Saints for two seasons seeing action in one game.

Tampa Bay Buccaneers
After the 2001 NFL season, Reyes suited up for the Tampa Bay Buccaneers but saw no game action.

Carolina Panthers
During the 2002 NFL season, he went to the Carolina Panthers. He started 12 games in the 2004 NFL season at right and left guard as part of the Carolina Panthers offensive line that used five different starting combinations. He made his first NFL start at left guard against the Kansas City Chiefs in 2004 and helped clear lanes for running back DeShaun Foster to rush for 174 yards, the fourth-highest total in Panthers history.
In 2005, Reyes had his best season as a pro. He started in all 16 regular season games, and 3 playoff games, helping lead the Panthers to their 2nd NFC Championship appearance in 3 years.

Buffalo Bills
After the 2005 NFL season, Reyes left the Panthers and signed with the Buffalo Bills. He started the first 6 games of the 2006 season at left guard before suffering a shoulder injury. Reyes would not play again that season.

Jacksonville Jaguars
On August 19, 2007, Reyes signed with the Jacksonville Jaguars. He saw action in one game that season. In 2008, Reyes started three games for the Jaguars, playing in 15.

New York Giants
Reyes signed with his hometown team, the New York Giants on May 21, 2009. He was later waived on September 15.

Houston Texans
Reyes was signed by the Houston Texans on October 14, 2009, in what would be his 10th and final NFL season.

References

External links

New York Giants bio

1977 births
Living people
African-American players of American football
American football offensive guards
American sportspeople of Dominican Republic descent
Buffalo Bills players
Carolina Panthers players
Houston Texans players
Jacksonville Jaguars players
New Orleans Saints players
New York Giants players
Ole Miss Rebels football players
Players of American football from New York (state)
21st-century African-American sportspeople
20th-century African-American sportspeople
Tampa Bay Buccaneers players